Ventanilla is a district of the Constitutional Province of Callao in Peru, and one of the seven districts that comprise the port city of Callao. Covering more than half of the province's territory, it is Callao's largest district.

The current mayor of Ventanilla is Pedro Carmelo Spadaro. It was officially established as a district on January 28, 1969. The first stone for the building of Ventanilla was placed on September 24, 1960, in what is now the Central Church of Ventanilla San Pedro Nolasco.

Geography
The district has a total land area of 73.52 km2. Its administrative center is located 71 meters above sea level. Ventanilla is located in the northern part of the province.

Ventanilla is made up of eight urban zones and more than 160 neighborhoods (barrios).

Boundaries
 North: Santa Rosa and Ancón (both in the Lima Province)
 East: Puente Piedra (Lima Province) and Mi Peru (Callao).
 South: Downtown Callao, and San Martín de Porres (Lima Province)
 West: Pacific Ocean

Demographics
According to the 2005 census by the INEI, the district has 243,526 inhabitants and a population density of 3312.4 persons/km2.

External links
  Municipalidad Distrital de Ventanilla
  Todo Callao
 Inka Magik helps this area through volunteering programmes.

Districts of the Callao Region
States and territories established in 1969
1969 establishments in Peru